The Fourteenth Government of the Republic of Croatia was the Croatian Government cabinet formed on 19 October 2016, following the 2016 election. It was led by Prime Minister Andrej Plenković. The cabinet was dissolved on 23 July 2020 and was succeeded by a new government presided over by Plenković.

Overview 
When naming the members of his own cabinet Plenković chose to retain eight ministers from the then outgoing Orešković cabinet:

Zdravko Marić remained Minister of Finance
Vlaho Orepić remained Minister of the Interior (until 27 April 2017)
Ante Šprlje remained Minister of Justice (until 27 April 2017)
Tomislav Tolušić became Minister of Agriculture after serving as Minister of Regional Development and EU Funds under Orešković
Lovro Kuščević remained Minister of Construction and Spatial Planning (until 9 June 2017)
Slaven Dobrović remained Minister of Environment, while getting the addition of Energy to his ministerial portfolio (until 27 April 2017)
Oleg Butković remained Minister of Maritime Affairs, Transport and Infrastructure
Tomo Medved remained Minister of Croatian Veterans, which was renamed from the Ministry of Veterans' Affairs in the previous cabinet

The cabinet was originally constituted by a coalition agreement between the Croatian Democratic Union (HDZ) and Bridge of Independent Lists (Most) and was voted into office by the Croatian Parliament on 19 October 2016, being approved by 91 out of 151 Members of Parliament. In April 2017, however, disagreements between HDZ and MOST over the ongoing crisis involving Agrokor and the role of Finance minister Zdravko Marić in possibly being able to avert the crisis led to the collapse of the coalition and Most's four cabinet ministers (Ivan Kovačić, Vlaho Orepić, Slaven Dobrović and Ante Šprlje) being removed from their posts by Prime Minister Plenković. On 9 June 2017 HDZ agreed on a coalition with the centrist Croatian People's Party-Liberal Democrats (HNS), and a cabinet reshuffle took place, with HNS being given two ministries in the cabinet. However, only 5 of HNS' 9 MPs agreed to support the new coalition, leading to a split within the party and the expulsion of the four rebellious MPs from HNS. The new make-up of the cabinet was approved on the same day by a majority of 78 out of 151 Members of the Croatian Parliament.

Following the reshuffle of 9 June 2017, two ministers from the previous make-up were given new portfolios:

Lovro Kuščević, previously serving as Minister of Construction and Spatial Planning became Minister of Public Administration
Tomislav Ćorić, previously serving as Minister of Labour and Pension System became Minister of Environmental Protection and Energy.

According to a regular monthly survey of political preferences conducted by Ipsos agency in November 2017, 74% of respondents thought Croatia was moving in a wrong direction, while 20% though opposite. The level of pessimism was highest since the approval of Plenković's cabinet a year earlier. According to the same survey, Government's policies were not supported by 62% of respondents, opposite to 29% who thought differently.

Motions of confidence

Party breakdown 
Party breakdown of cabinet ministers:

List of Ministers

Former members

References

Plenkovic, Andrej
2016 establishments in Croatia
Cabinets established in 2016
2020 disestablishments in Croatia
Cabinets disestablished in 2020